Todd Richard Skinner (October 27, 1958 – October 23, 2006) was an American rock climber and expert in big wall climbing.

Skinner's story was told in Jeff Smoot's 2019 book, Hangdog Days.

Personal life
Skinner was born in Pinedale, Wyoming, and planned to "take a little while off to climb" after gaining a degree in finance from the University of Wyoming in 1982. Instead, he became a full-time free climber and motivational speaker. In 1990, he settled in Lander, Wyoming, in part because he considered the dolomite cliffs there to be the ultimate training ground for free climbing. He opened the Wild Iris Mountain Sports store in Lander and encouraged visits by climbers from around the world. He was married with three children.

Death
Todd Skinner was attempting to free climb the Jesus Built My Hotrod route up the face of Leaning Tower in Yosemite National Park on October 23, 2006. While rappelling down, he fell 500-feet and died. The cause of death was the failure of the belay loop of his climbing harness. Jim Hewett, a friend of Skinner, had previously observed that the harness appeared worn.

Notable first free ascents
 1985 – The Gunfighter (5.13b), Hueco Tanks, Texas, United States.
 1986 – City Park (5.13d), Lower Index Town Wall, Washington, United States
 1989 – Lizzy Beams Desire (5.14a), Black Hills, South Dakota, United States
 1990 – The Jaded Lady (VI 5.12a), North face of Mt. Hooker, Wind River Range, Wyoming.  With Paul Piana, Galen Rowell and Tim Toula.
 1992 – The Great Canadian Knife (VI 5.13b), Cirque of the Unclimbables, Yukon Territories, Canada.
 1993 – Northwest Direct Route (VI 5.13d) on Half Dome, Yosemite.<ref name=Climbing>
 1995 – Cowboy Direct (VII 5.13a) East Face of Nameless Tower, Pakistan's Karakoram Himalayas.
 1998 – War and Poetry (VI 5.12c), Ulamertorsuaq, Cape Farewell, of Greenland
 2000 – True at First Light (VI 5.13a), East Face of Poi, Ndoto Mountains, Northern Kenya
 2004 – Wet Lycra Nightmare (V 5.13d), Leaning Tower, Yosemite, California, United States

See also
List of grade milestones in rock climbing
History of rock climbing

References

External links
Official Website
Denver Post article on his death
Obituary, Independent (UK)
Website for Todd's book Beyond the Summit
Todd Skinner's climbing biography

American rock climbers
People from Pinedale, Wyoming
Mountaineering deaths
Deaths in Yosemite National Park
Accidental deaths in California
1958 births
2006 deaths
People from Lander, Wyoming